Boulaye may refer to
Boulaye (name)
La Boulaye, a commune in eastern France
Fort De La Boulaye Site, a fort built by the French in south Louisiana, U.S., in 1699–1700